The Nexus (later renamed The New Nexus in January 2011) was a villainous professional wrestling stable in WWE that competed on the Raw brand from June 7, 2010 to August 22, 2011, originally consisting of eight rookies of NXT season one and shifted their roster several times throughout their 14-month existence, with David Otunga being the only member to serve the group throughout the entirety of its existence. Their initial goal was to obtain WWE contracts for all members, with the exception of original leader Wade Barrett, who already had a WWE contract for winning the first season of  NXT.

After NXT, the group went on to antagonize the Raw roster (and on two occasions the SmackDown roster), with then-WWE Champion John Cena as their main focus, who forcibly became a member of The Nexus after losing a match at Hell in a Cell thanks to outside interference. However, Cena was eventually removed from the group by being fired at Survivor Series after Barrett lost his WWE Championship match to Randy Orton in November 2010, only to be rehired by Barrett three weeks later, but only because Otunga gave Barrett an ultimatum—that either Barrett rehire Cena or he would be out of the group.

On the January 3, 2011 edition of Raw, Barrett was exiled from the group after losing a triple threat steel cage match against Orton and King Sheamus to determine the number one contender for the WWE Championship as well as Barrett's leadership, which Barrett lost in favor of Punk after losing a chairs match at TLC: Tables Ladders & Chairs in December 2010. CM Punk, who ended up costing Barrett the match, officially became the new leader, at which point the stable was renamed The New Nexus in an attempt to distance itself from The Nexus, becoming a tight-knit group dedicated to one another by faith. The group won the WWE Tag Team Championship three times—two of those under Barrett's leadership—while Punk won the WWE Championship in his final match with the stable at Money in the Bank on July 17, 2011. The remaining members continued to wrestle in the independent scene.

Concept
On the February 2, 2010 edition of ECW, WWE Chairman Vince McMahon announced that NXT would replace ECW on Syfy when the latter ended its run on February 16, describing NXT as "the next evolution of WWE television history." The concept of the stable was derived from each original member of them being a contestant on the first season of the NXT program, which composed at the time of the talent from WWE's developmental territory Florida Championship Wrestling. The series ran them through a competition to become WWE's next breakout star with the help of mentors from WWE's Raw and SmackDown brands. On the June 1, 2010 edition of NXT, Barrett was declared the winner over Otunga and — as a result — was awarded a WWE contract and a championship match at a WWE pay-per-view of his choosing (he ultimately chose Night of Champions), while the others were left without a job.

History

World Wrestling Entertainment/WWE

Formation and feud with John Cena

The group made its debut on the June 7, 2010 "Viewer's Choice" edition of Raw, during the main event which saw Punk face Cena (after beating out Rey Mysterio and then-World Heavyweight Champion Jack Swagger with 45% of the viewer vote). They attacked Cena, Punk, Luke Gallows, Hall of Famer Jerry Lawler, NXT host Matt Striker (who joined Lawler and Michael Cole on commentary), then-Raw ring announcer Justin Roberts, timekeeper Mark Yeaton and other WWE personnel around the ring - before destroying everything at ringside, including the ring itself, forcing the match to end in a no contest. During the attack, which ended with Cena being taken out on a stretcher, Daniel Bryan strangled Roberts with his necktie and, in a sign of disrespect, spit in Cena's face; the latter of which led him to be released from his contract on June 11, 2010 as WWE reportedly felt those acts were too violent for the company's TV-PG programming. His absence was explained by Barrett on the June 14, 2010 edition of Raw as having felt remorse for his actions, who kicked him out of the group. Barrett claimed that their violent arrival was a result of their mistreatment during the NXT competition, and insinuated that their issues lied more with WWE management than anyone in the locker room except their mentor "Pros". None of the members apologized for the events of the previous week when prompted by Barrett, as he had been asked to do by higher-ups earlier in the day. When confronted by Hall of Famer Bret Hart, who was named Raw General Manager three weeks earlier, they threatened to continue the attacks if their list of demands - especially getting guaranteed WWE contracts - were not met. Nexus was established as the main heel stable on Raw, attacking several wrestlers and legends over the next several weeks, including Hart and McMahon themselves and fellow Hall of Famers Ricky Steamboat and Dusty Rhodes. After Hart's attack, which occurred during the tag team match where Cena teamed with Orton to take on Sheamus and Edge in a Fatal 4-Way preview, McMahon removed him as Raw General Manager "due to his injuries" and subsequently appointed a new General Manager. The GM chose to remain anonymous for fear of being attacked like Hart was, communicating only through e-mails quoted by Cole, the "official spokesman" (and the only one not attacked by the group during their invasion).

During the summer of 2010, Nexus had a feud with Cena. First, Cena was scheduled to face The Nexus in a 7-on-1 handicap match on the July 12, 2010 edition of Raw, but Cena attacked Darren Young the previous week, subsequently removing him from the following week's scheduled match, which became a 6-on-1 handicap match, which The Nexus won anyway. On July 18, 2010 at Money in the Bank, The Nexus attempted to get involved in the WWE Championship match involving Sheamus and Cena in a steel cage, but Sheamus and Cena were able to hold them off and escape, with Sheamus winning the match and retaining the WWE Championship. Their following match would take place at SummerSlam, where The Nexus faced the team of Cena, Hart, Edge, Chris Jericho, John Morrison, R-Truth and the returning Bryan (who replaced The Great Khali), losing after Cena pinned Gabriel—who missed on a 450º splash attempt—and submitted Barrett with the STF. According to Edge and Jericho, the original plan was to put Barrett over and establish them as legitimate threats to WWE, with Edge and Jericho being the last members of Team WWE to be eliminated by Barrett, but Cena refused to lose to The Nexus and had the finish changed around the time of the event. Nexus members Heath Slater and Darren Young later stated that they agreed that The Nexus' loss at SummerSlam permanently crippled the stable's momentum. The following night on Raw, in order to find the "weak links" of the group, The Nexus invoked their SummerSlam rematch clause and competed in seven one-on-one matches against Team WWE (except Hart, who was replaced by Orton), with the stipulation that whichever Nexus member lost their match would be exiled from the group. Young was the only Nexus member who lost, as he failed to defeat Cena in the main event. As a result, The Nexus attacked Young with their respective finishing moves and officially exiled him from the group. At a WWE live event in Hawaii on August 18, 2010, Skip Sheffield broke his ankle during a tag match where he teamed with Otunga against The Hart Dynasty (David Hart Smith and Tyson Kidd), putting him out of action for the next two years, leaving The Nexus with only five active members heading into September. At Night of Champions on September 19, Barrett used his guaranteed championship match that he won for winning NXT in the six-pack elimination challenge for Sheamus' WWE Championship, but he was eliminated by Orton, who later won the match and the title.

At Hell in a Cell on October 3, Barrett and Cena faced each other in a match with the stipulation that if Barrett won, Cena would have to join The Nexus, but if Cena won or any other Nexus member got involved, the group would be permanently disbanded. Thanks to interference from Husky Harris and Michael McGillicutty, two rookies from the second season of NXT who would later join The Nexus on the October 25, 2010 edition of Raw, Barrett managed to win the match and keep the group going and Cena was forced to join The Nexus. The following night on Raw, Cena attacked Michael Tarver following a tag-team match. In the subsequent segment, Barrett stated that Cena did him a favor, as he was planning on getting rid of Tarver anyway, implying that Tarver was no longer a member (in reality, Tarver had a nagging groin injury and was later released from his contract in June 2011). The anonymous Raw General Manager stated that Cena had to honor the stipulations of the Hell in a Cell match and take orders from Barrett or be fired, but later that night, Barrett instead ordered Cena to help him win the number one contender battle royal for Orton's WWE Championship at Bragging Rights and, as the match came down to Cena and Barrett, Barrett won the match after Cena eliminated himself. At Bragging Rights on October 24, The Nexus won their first championships in WWE when Cena and Otunga defeated Cody Rhodes and Drew McIntyre to win the WWE Tag Team Championship, while in the main event, Barrett defeated Orton via disqualification, this time caused by Cena who, as a result, was chosen by Barrett as his own special guest referee for his WWE Championship rematch against Orton at Survivor Series, declaring that unless he won the title, Cena would be fired, but if Barrett defeated Orton, Cena would be relieved of all responsibilities to The Nexus. The following night on Raw, Justin Gabriel and Heath Slater won the WWE Tag Team Championship after Barrett ordered Otunga to allow Slater to pin him.

On the November 5, 2010 edition of SmackDown, Otunga, who had been questioning Barrett's leadership over the past several weeks ever since Barrett cost him and Cena the WWE Tag Team Championship, led Harris, McGillicutty, Gabriel and Slater to a second invasion of SmackDown, interrupting a match between Edge and Alberto Del Rio, but The Nexus was then defeated in the main event in a 5-on-5 tag team match by Edge, Del Rio, Big Show, Kane and Kofi Kingston. Barrett did not approve Otunga's decision to lead The Nexus to SmackDown and, as a result, forced him to defend his spot in the group the following week. On the November 12, 2010 edition of SmackDown, thanks to interference from Kane, Otunga defeated Edge in a lumberjack match to keep his spot in The Nexus. At Survivor Series on November 21, Orton retained the WWE Championship against Barrett via pinfall following an RKO and Cena was fired (kayfabe) from WWE and subsequently exiled from The Nexus. The following night on Raw, Miz cashed in his Money in the Bank and became WWE Champion after Cena attacked Barrett, allowing Orton to pin Barrett and retain the title. Despite being fired by Barrett, Cena continued to show up on Raw as a ticketholder in the subsequent weeks, causing interference in The Nexus' matches, including costing Slater and Gabriel the WWE Tag Team Championship to Santino Marella and Vladimir Kozlov in a fatal four-way tag team elimination match on the December 6, 2010 edition of Raw. Later that night, Cena informed The Nexus that his attacks on them may stop, but only on the condition that Barrett rehires him, causing a mutiny within The Nexus in the process. Wanting the attacks to stop, Otunga, on behalf of The Nexus, delivered an ultimatum to Barrett that unless he brought Cena back, he would be exiled from the group. On the December 13, 2010 edition of Raw, Barrett rehired Cena for fear of being exiled by The Nexus, but on the condition that A. Cena face Otunga in the main event and B. Barrett and Cena settle the score in a chairs match at TLC: Tables, Ladders & Chairs. At TLC: Tables, Ladders & Chairs on December 19, Cena defeated Barrett in the main event and, after the match, dropped 23 steel chairs from the stage on him after dispatching the rest of The Nexus.

The New Nexus

On the January 3, 2011 edition of Raw, The Nexus ambiguously announced after months of repeated attacks on Cena and the WWE roster that it was under "new management," with Punk (who disbanded the Straight Edge Society the previous September) being revealed to be the new leader. He acquired the position after Barrett lost a #1 contendership steel cage match involving Orton and Sheamus. Punk, having agreed to fall in line had Barrett successfully won the title shot, teased helping Barrett escape the cage before knocking him off of it. Barrett was subsequently exiled from The Nexus, which would be renamed "The New Nexus" to distance itself from former leadership. After refusing to follow Punk's orders of initiation by hitting each other with kendo sticks, Gabriel and Slater left the group the following week on Raw, opting to join Barrett and former ECW Champion Ezekiel Jackson on SmackDown as The Corre while Harris, McGillicutty and Otunga successfully completed Punk's initiation. On the January 17, 2011 edition of Raw, Mason Ryan joined The New Nexus after interfering in Punk's match against Cena, attacking both before Punk handed Ryan a Nexus armband. On January 30, 2011 at the Royal Rumble, The New Nexus, who were also a part of the 40-man Royal Rumble match along with The Corre, cost Orton his rematch clause for Miz's WWE Championship, starting a feud with him. Over the ongoing weeks, Orton defeated all members of The New Nexus, causing several storyline injuries by punting them. On April 3, 2011 at WrestleMania XXVII, Orton defeated Punk and, on May 1, 2011 at Extreme Rules, Orton defeated Punk in a Last Man Standing rematch. On the May 23, 2011 edition of Raw, thanks to a distraction from The New Nexus, McGillicutty and Otunga defeated Big Show and Kane for the WWE Tag Team Championship.
On the June 20, 2011 "Power to the People" edition of Raw, Punk was originally going to be named the number one contender for Cena's WWE Championship, but instead, he was forced to compete in a triple threat match with Alberto Del Rio and Rey Mysterio with a Falls Count Anywhere stipulation voted for by fans which Punk won, revealing after the match that his WWE contract would expire at Money in the Bank, where he would face Cena for the WWE Championship. The following week on Raw, it was announced that Ryan suffered an injury over the weekend and left the group. That same night, a brash Punk realized a worked shoot promo (which he dubbed a "pipe bomb"), reminding that once his contract expired at Money in the Bank, that would be the last time WWE would ever see him and the WWE Championship, as he considered taking his talents to another wrestling promotion, like Ring of Honor and New Japan Pro-Wrestling. With his victory over Cena on July 17, 2011, the WWE Championship was finally held by the stable on their last night of existence.

Tag team and dissolution
The group's final members then functioned as a tag team with the New Nexus banner until August 1, 2011 and continued without the banner until August 22, 2011, when the group disbanded after a 14-month existence following a loss of the WWE Tag Team Championships to Kofi Kingston and Evan Bourne.

Independent circuit
In April 2018, The Nexus reunited for Chikara King of Trios tournament as The Nexus Alliance, being represented by Tyrone Evans (Michael Tarver), Fred Rosser (Darren Young) and P. J. Black (Justin Gabriel).

Cancelled WWE return
Darren Young stated that The Nexus were originally booked to return at WrestleMania 36. A year later a documentary about the Nexus was cancelled with Darren Young theorizing it was due to Daniel Bryan leaving WWE.

Legacy 
As the group predicted, it would ultimately serve as a launching pad for several debuting superstars in the WWE at that time. However, some members would later be repackaged with different gimmicks to varying degrees of success. Daniel Bryan and Husky Harris would go on to have the biggest success out of the former Nexus members, becoming the only world champions in the group. To date, Bryan is a four-time WWE Champion and a one-time World Heavyweight Champion, while also gaining secondary and tag team titles. Harris would return to FCW in March 2011 and be completely reimagined in April 2012 as the cult leader Bray Wyatt, only to make his return to the main roster as the leader of The Wyatt Family in July 2013. During his time in WWE, he would win the WWE Championship one time and the Universal Championship twice. Bryan and Wyatt ended their tenures in April and July 2021 respectively, with Bryan signing with All Elite Wrestling in the fall and reverting to his real name Bryan Danielson, and Wyatt returning to the company in October 2022.

Some members have had success as an upper mid-carder. Wade Barrett, who later wrestled as Bad News Barrett and King Barrett, became a five-time Intercontinental Champion and King of the Ring winner until he left the promotion in May 2016 (though he returned as a color commentator of the now-revamped NXT in August 2020). Michael McGillicutty underwent a name change to Curtis Axel in May 2013, propelling him to soon after obtain the Intercontinental Championship. He held the Raw Tag Team Championship once as part of the "B Team" with Bo Dallas before leaving the company in April 2020. Skip Sheffield returned from injury with a winning streak as Ryback, eventually challenging for the WWE Championship and winning the Intercontinental Championship, then ultimately departing in August 2016.

Other members would be used as lower-card wrestlers, with most of them exiting the company in the following years. David Otunga is still currently employed by the WWE in a non-wrestling role, serving as an occasional panelist for its pay-per-view events. Heath Slater, one of the last long-standing members of the stable, left WWE in April 2020 after partaking in several storylines — including functioning as a jobber to Legends. His most successful run resulted in becoming one-half of the first SmackDown Tag Team Champions with Rhyno. Darren Young secured the WWE Tag Team Championship with Titus O'Neil and was mentored by Bob Backlund in a singles run before being released in October 2017. Justin Gabriel mainly appeared in mid-level or tag team title pursuits, quitting the company in January 2015. Michael Tarver and Mason Ryan did not have a long-term impact, with Tarver being gone by 2011 and Ryan by 2014.

Members

Timeline

Championships and accomplishments

 The Baltimore Sun
 Feud of the Year (2010) 
 Pro Wrestling Illustrated
 Feud of the Year (2010) 
 Most Hated Wrestler of the Year (2010)
 Rookie of the Year (2010) – David Otunga
 World Wrestling Entertainment/WWE
 WWE Championship (1 time) – CM Punk
 WWE Tag Team Championship (3 times) – John Cena and David Otunga (1), Heath Slater and Justin Gabriel (1), David Otunga and Michael McGillicutty (1)
 Slammy Award (1 time)
 Shocker of the Year (2010)

See also
 The Corre

References

WWE teams and stables
Independent promotions teams and stables